Lightcliffe railway station served the village of Lightcliffe in West Yorkshire, England. It was opened in August 1850 and was a victim of the Beeching cuts on 14 June 1965.

References

External links
 Lightcliffe station on navigable 1947 O. S. map

Disused railway stations in Calderdale
Former Lancashire and Yorkshire Railway stations
Beeching closures in England
Railway stations in Great Britain opened in 1850
Railway stations in Great Britain closed in 1965